The 1983 Cork Senior Football Championship was the 95th staging of the Cork Senior Football Championship since its establishment by the Cork County Board in 1887. The draw for the opening round fixtures took place on 30 January 1983. The championship began on 17 April 1983 and ended on 23 November 1983.

St. Finbarr's entered the championship as the defending champions, however, they were beaten by Nemo Rangers at the semi-final stage.

On 27 November 1983, Nemo Rangers won the championship following a 4-12 to 2-03 defeat of Clonakilty in the final. This was their seventh championship title overall and their first title since 1981.

Ephie Fitzgerald from the Nemo Rangers club was the championship's top scorer with 2-23.

Results

First round

Second round

Quarter-finals

Semi-finals

Final

Championship statistics

Top scorers

Overall

In a single game

References

Cork Senior Football Championship